Richard Bulkeley may refer to:

Richard Bulkeley III, MP for Anglesey (1589)
Richard Bulkeley (died 1573),  MP for Anglesey (variously between 1549 and 1572)
Richard Bulkeley (died 1621) (1533–1621), MP for Anglesey (1563, 1604–1614), son of the above
Richard Bulkeley (died 1640), MP for Anglesey (1626–1629)
, trawler, originally HMT Richard Bulkeley, later USS Richard Bulkeley

Bulkeley baronets
Sir Richard Bulkeley, 1st Baronet (1634–1685), Irish MP for Baltinglass
Sir Richard Bulkeley, 2nd Baronet (1660–1710), Irish MP for Fethard (County Wexford)

Viscounts Bulkeley
Richard Bulkeley, 3rd Viscount Bulkeley (–1704), MP for Beaumaris (1679) and Anglesey (1679–1685, 1690–1704)
Richard Bulkeley, 4th Viscount Bulkeley (1682–1724), MP for Anglesey (1704–1715, 1722–1724), son of the above
Richard Bulkeley, 5th Viscount Bulkeley (1707–1738), MP for Beaumaris (1730–1739), son of the above

Other people
 Richard Bulkeley (civil servant), (1717–1800), administrator of Nova Scotia

See also
Richard Williams-Bulkeley (disambiguation)
Richard Bulkeley Philipps Philipps, 1st Baron Milford)